The 2015 NCAA Division I Outdoor Track and Field Championships was held from June 10 to June 13, 2015. This was the 94th NCAA Men's Division I Outdoor Track and Field Championships and the 34th NCAA Women's Division I Outdoor Track and Field Championships. The meet was held for the third consecutive year at Hayward Field in Eugene, Oregon, on the campus of the University of Oregon. 

In total, 42 different men's and women's track and field events were contested.  The men's distance events were historically slow due to wind and heat. University of Oregon was the overall men's and women's winner of the meet by points.

Results

Men's events

100 meters
Only top eight final results shown; no prelims are listed
Wind: +2.7 mps

200 meters
Only top eight final results shown; no prelims are listed
Wind: +2.4 mps

400 meters
Only top eight final results shown; no prelims are listed

800 meters
Only top eight final results shown; no prelims are listed

1500 meters
Only top eight final results shown; no prelims are listed

5000 meters
Only top eight final results shown

10000 meters
Only top eight final results shown

110 meters hurdles
Only top eight final results shown; no prelims are listed
Wind: +3.9 mps

400 meters hurdles
Only top eight final results shown; no prelims are listed

3000 meters steeplechase
Only top eight final results shown; no prelims are listed

4 x 100 meters relay
Only top eight final results shown; no prelims are listed

4 x 400 meters relay
Only top eight final results shown; no prelims are listed

Long Jump
Only top eight final results shown; no prelims are listed

Triple Jump
Only top eight final results shown; no prelims are listed

High Jump
Only top eight final results shown; no prelims are listed

Pole Vault
Only top eight final results shown; no prelims are listed

Shot Put
Only top eight final results shown; no prelims are listed

Discus throw
Only top eight final results shown; no prelims are listed

Javelin throw
Only top eight final results shown; no prelims are listed

Hammer throw
Only top eight final results shown; no prelims are listed

Decathlon
Only top eight final results shown; no prelims are listed

Women's events

100 meters
Only top eight final results shown; no prelims are listed
Wind: +3.1 mps

200 meters
Only top eight final results shown; no prelims are listed
Wind: +1.9 mps

400 meters
Only top eight final results shown; no prelims are listed

800 meters
Only top eight final results shown; no prelims are listed

1500 meters
Only top eight final results shown; no prelims are listed

5000 meters
Only top eight final results shown

10000 meters
Only top eight final results shown; no prelims are listed

100 meters hurdles
Only top eight final results shown; no prelims are listed
Wind: +1.7 mps

400 meters hurdles
Only top eight final results shown; no prelims are listed

3000 meters steeplechase
Only top eight final results shown; no prelims are listed

4 x 100 meters relay
Only top eight final results shown; no prelims are listed

4 x 400 meters relay
Only top eight final results shown; no prelims are listed

Long Jump
Only top eight final results shown; no prelims are listed

Triple Jump
Only top eight final results shown; no prelims are listed

High Jump
Only top eight final results shown; no prelims are listed

Pole Vault
Only top eight final results shown; no prelims are listed

Shot Put
Only top eight final results shown; no prelims are listed

Discus throw
Only top eight final results shown; no prelims are listed

Javelin Throw
Only top eight final results shown; no prelims are listed

Hammer Throw
Only top eight final results shown; no prelims are listed

Heptathlon
Only top eight final results shown; no prelims are listed

Standings

Men
Only top ten teams shown

Women
Only top ten teams shown

See also
 NCAA Men's Division I Outdoor Track and Field Championships 
 NCAA Women's Division I Outdoor Track and Field Championships

References

NCAA Men's Outdoor Track and Field Championship
NCAA Division I Outdoor Track and Field Championships
NCAA Division I Outdoor Track and Field Championships
NCAA Women's Outdoor Track and Field Championship